Borensztein is a surname. Notable people with the surname include:

Leon Borensztein (born 1947), American photographer
Mauricio Borensztein (1927–1996), Argentine film, theatre, and television comedian
Sebastián Borensztein (born 1963), Argentine writer and director

See also
Borenstein